Myoporum petiolatum, commonly known as sticky boobialla, is a plant in the figwort family Scrophulariaceae, and is endemic to the south-east of continental Australia. For many years this species has been confused with the much less common species Myoporum viscosum from which it can be distinguished by its thinner, noticeably petiolate and non-odorous leaves.

Description
The leaf margins have tiny serrations.

There are 5 narrow triangular sepals and 5 petals forming a tube with spreading lobes on the end. The petals are white with a slight lilac flush and purple spots on the lobes and in the tube.

Taxonomy and naming
Myoporum petiolatum was first formally described by taxonomist Bob Chinnock in Eremophila and allied genera: a monograph of the plant family Myoporaceae in 2007 from a specimen collected in the Waitpinga Conservation Park. The specific epithet is from the Latin petiolatum, 'with a petiole', referring to the leaves.

Distribution and habitat
Myoporum petiolatum occurs in South Australia and Victoria. It is found in and between the Flinders Ranges, the Mount Lofty Ranges, Kangaroo Island and the ranges around Melbourne. It often grows in exposed parts of woodland.

References

petiolatum
Flora of South Australia
Flora of Victoria (Australia)
Lamiales of Australia
Plants described in 2007
Taxa named by Robert Chinnock